Michael Astrapas and Eutychios ( (flourished 1294 to 1317) were Roman (Byzantine) painters from Thessaloniki.  They had a very active workshop in the area and some of their work survived.  Famous Thessalonian painter Manuel Panselinos was active around the same period.  Thessaloniki was considered the second capital of the Byzantine Empire.  The region featured many iconographic workshops.  Most historians consider Thessaloniki the epicenter of the Macedonian School of painting during the  Palaeologan Renaissance.  Other prominent Byzantine artists were Ioannis Pagomenos, Theophanes the Greek and Theodore Apsevdis.  The Byzantine style influenced countless Italian and Greek artists.  The style eventually evolved into the Maniera Greca.

History
Michael Astrapas and Eutychios were active painters in Northern Greece and the Macedonian region.  Not much is known about the artists. Luckily they signed their work. There are documented stories about the work that did not survive.  There were many active iconographic workshops in Thessaloniki.  It was the second capital of the Byzantine Empire.  Manuel Panselinos had a famous workshop in the same geographic region.  The artists followed the traditional Byzantine style.  Michael Astrapas and Eutychios traveled all over the empire from modern Greece, North Macedonia, and Serbia.

The artists were invited to Serbia by king Stefan Milutin. They were also hired by other patrons to work in their dominions on commissions as icon painters.  The names Michael and Eutychios were persevered in the inscriptions of four churches at Staro Nagoricino, Prizren, Banjani, and Ohrid.  The frescoes exhibit strong chiaroscuro and heavy folds within the heavy drapery.  There is a frescos cycle outlining the life of Mary including the Dormition.  This can be found in the prothesis of the Church of Saint George.

One theory explains that Eutychios Astrapas was Michael Astrapas's father.  Markovic explains that because of the difference in painting styles a plausible argument can be made that there is a father-son relationship between the two artists.  Some of the work was signed the hand of Michael, son of Eutychios.

Gallery

Notable works
Church of the Holy Mother of God Peribleptos at Ohrid (1294)
Church of Saint Niketas at Čucer Sandevo (before 1315)
Church of Our Lady of Ljeviš in Prizren (1307)
Church of Saint George at Staro Nagoričane (1317)

See also
Byzantine art
Palaeologan Age

List of Macedonians (Greek)
List of painters from Serbia

References

Further reading
SALVADOR-GONZALEZ, J. M. (2011). The Death of the Virgin Mary (1295) in the Macedonian church of the Panagia Peribleptos in Ohrid. Iconographic interpretation from the perspective of three apocryphal writings. Mirabilia. Electronic Journal of Antiquity & Middle Ages, Nº 13, Julio-Diciembre 2011, Institut d’Estudis Medievals, Universitat Autònoma De Barcelona, p. 237–268. . .

External links
Ohrid-St Kliment

Greek painters
Byzantine painters
Byzantine Thessalonians
13th-century births
14th-century deaths
Christianity in medieval Macedonia
Art duos
People of the Kingdom of Serbia (medieval)
13th-century Byzantine people
14th-century Byzantine people
13th-century Greek people
14th-century Greek people
13th-century Greek painters
14th-century Greek painters